Andy Federico Preciado Madrigal (born 12 october 1997 in Rioverde) is an Ecuadorian decathlete.

He holds the national record for decathlon since 2017 (7528 points) that he improved in 2021 to 8004 points by winning the South American Championships in Guayaquil. He scored 8004 pts, 476-point improvement on his previous record, thanks to five personal bests: 10.95 in the 100m, 51.28 in the 400m, 14.23 in the 110m hurdles, 4.50m in the pole vault and 4:45.03 for 1500 m.

References

External links
 

1997 births
Living people
Ecuadorian male athletes
South American Games gold medalists in athletics
People from Río Verde Canton
South American Championships in Athletics winners
21st-century Ecuadorian people